Wayne R. Munroe KC is a Bahamian lawyer. He is immediate past President of the Bahamas Bar Association.

Munroe is the Principal in the firm of Munroe & Associates, and was admitted to the Bar of England and Wales by the Honourable Society of the Inner Temple on 26 July 1990, and to the Bar of the Commonwealth of The Bahamas on 24 August 1990.

He is most famous outside of the Bahamas for his representation of Anna Nicole Smith.

He was appointed Queen's Counsel in January 2015.

References

External links
Munroe & Associates

Living people
Bahamian Queen's Counsel
20th-century Bahamian lawyers
21st-century Bahamian lawyers
1968 births
Government ministers of the Bahamas